Ágnes "Ági" Csomor (born June 13, 1979) is a Hungarian stage, film and television actress. Currently, she is starring in the Hungarian television soap opera Barátok közt (in English: Among Friends) running on RTL Klub as antagonist Oravecz Nikol, a character who became the boss of a drug cartel after arresting her brother while raising her teenage son who's opposing his mother's underworld connections.

Life

Csomor was born on 13 June 1979 in Budapest but was raised at Bicske. She graduated from the Vajda János Secondary Grammar School at Bicske in 1997. She took a degree at the GNM School of Dramatic Art headed by Hungarian actress Mária Gór Nagy (in Hungarian: GNM /Gór Nagy Mária/ Színitanoda) in 2001. After her graduation in the school of dramatic art she started to teach in the acting classes for kids (GNM Tinitanoda).
She played at National Theatre of Szeged from 2001 until 2006. In 2012 she became the art director and bursar of the acting classes for kids in GNM School of Dramatic Art in Szeged.

She played with Hungarian film stars like Ferenc Zenthe, István Bujtor, Géza Tordy and András Kern in the TV series Komédiások (Comedians) as Éva Pereszlényi, the illegitimate daughter of Balázs Boday, who is the fictional character of the director of National Theatre of Győr starring István Bujtor.

From 2014 she is starring in the Hungarian television soap opera Barátok közt (in English: Among Friends) running on RTL Klub as antagonist Nikol Oravecz. She has only daughter, Emese.

Selected stage roles 
 Franz Lehár: The Merry Widow (Olga; Praskowia) 
 Luigi Pirandello: Six Characters in Search of an Author (Stepdaughter) 
 Béla Zsolt: Nemzeti drogéria (National Drugstore/Pharmacy) (Boris) 
 Carlo Collodi: The Adventures of Pinocchio (Butterfly) 
 Shakespeare: A Midsummer Night's Dream (Fairy)
Shakespeare: As You Like It
 Peter Shaffer: Equus (Jill Mason) 
 Michel Tremblay: Les Belles-sœurs (Lise Paquette)
Andersen–Zsolt Pozsgai: The Snow Queen (The Tame Crow)

Filmography 
Barátok közt (Among Friends; TV series) (in the role of Nikol Oravecz) – 2014
Komédiások (Comedians; TV series) (in the role of Éva Pereszlényi) – 2000

External links 

 

1979 births
Living people
Actresses from Budapest
Hungarian film actresses
Hungarian television actresses
Hungarian stage actresses
People from Bicske